The strafing of the Little Egg Harbor Intermediate School was an incident in Little Egg Harbor Township, New Jersey, United States, in 2004, when a military aircraft on a training mission unintentionally discharged 27 cannon rounds while attempting to operate an aircraft mounted laser. The aircraft was within the training range, as was the target that the laser was pointed at, which was approximately 90 degrees to the side of the aircraft. However, the cannon fires to the front of the aircraft. Teachers and students were absent at the time. Nobody was injured.

Incident
The lead pilot was on a training ride in pursuit of an upgrade to instructor pilot. A recent software change in the F-16 allowed the externally mounted targeting pod to stabilize on a spot on the earth when the avionics were in Air to Ground Mode, Strafe Sub-Mode. The pilot intended to fire a laser at a strafe target located on the range. The laser and gun share the same trigger. The pilot pulled the trigger, firing not only the laser but also the internal M61 Vulcan cannon, discharging 27 rounds of 20mm ammunition which struck the ground, eight striking the school's roof and the rest hitting the parking lot and the side of the building. 

A janitor, who saw holes in the ceiling and had heard something on the roof, contacted the police.

Reaction
Meanwhile, in Little Egg Harbor, students had been off from school for the New Jersey Teachers' Convention. The school was repaired over the break, and there was an investigation that took over 30 days, sometimes during class times. The day the students returned to the school, there was live coverage from major news networks. 

At the time of the incident, The Little Egg Harbor Intermediate School had over 1,100 students in grades 3–6. In 2009, the school was renovated into a K-6 school and was renamed to the Frog Pond Elementary School.

Aftermath
On November 1, 2006, the district and the United States Air Force announced that a settlement had been reached, whereby the district would be paid $519,070.70 to cover damage to the roof of the school caused in the incident. This is less than the $900,000 that the superintendent had indicated would be needed to cover the costs of replacing the roof damaged in the incident and the process of evaluating the roof's condition after the incident.

References

 MSNBC, Wed., Nov. 1, 2006 – N.J. school strafed by F-16 to get $519,070. Jet hit elementary school during nighttime training exercise in 2004
By D'Vera Cohn and Allan Lengel. Washington Post. Friday, November 5, 2004; Page B01. D.C. Guard Jet Fires, Hitting N.J. School

External links
 Little Egg Harbor School District

Ocean County, New Jersey
Disasters in schools
2004 in New Jersey